João Mendes (18 June 1919 – 28 August 1997) was a Portuguese film director. He directed 33 films between 1944 and 1982.

Selected filmography
 Portuguese Rhapsody (1959) - Entered into the 1959 Cannes Film Festival.

References

External links

1919 births
1997 deaths
Portuguese film directors
People from Lisbon